Thomas Blackwood Murray (3 October 1877 in Biggar, South Lanarkshire – 3 June 1944) was a Scottish curler. He was part of the Royal Caledonian Curling Club team which won the first Olympic gold medal in curling at the inaugural Winter Olympics in Chamonix, France, in 1924.

See also
Curling at the 1924 Winter Olympics

References

External links
 

1877 births
1944 deaths
Scottish male curlers
British male curlers
Olympic curlers of Great Britain
Olympic gold medallists for Great Britain
Olympic medalists in curling
Curlers at the 1924 Winter Olympics
Medalists at the 1924 Winter Olympics
Scottish Olympic medallists